San Lucas (the Spanish-language name of St. Luke) is sometimes used as a toponym: 

Belize
San Lucas, Belize, a village in Toledo District, Belize

Colombia
Serrania of San Lucas (mountains)

Costa Rica
San Lucas Island

Guatemala
San Lucas Sacatepéquez (Sacatepéquez department)
San Lucas Tolimán (Sololá department)

Honduras
San Lucas, El Paraíso

Mexico 
San Lucas, Chiapas
San Lucas, Michoacán
San Lucas Tecopilco, Tlaxcala
San Lucas Quiavini, Oaxaca
San Lucas Zoquiapam, Oaxaca
Cabo San Lucas, Baja California Sur

Nicaragua
San Lucas, Madriz

United States
San Lucas, California
San Lucas AVA, California wine region in Monterey County